Al-Mohandessin Sport Club is an Iraqi football team based in Baghdad, that plays in Iraq Division Two.

Managerial history

  Karim Nafea
  Karim Mahmoud 
  Khalaf Habash

See also 
 2016–17 Iraq FA Cup
 2018–19 Iraq FA Cup
 2021–22 Iraq FA Cup

References

External links
 Al-Mohandessin SC on Goalzz.com
 Iraq Clubs- Foundation Dates

2016 establishments in Iraq
Association football clubs established in 2016
Football clubs in Baghdad
Sport in Baghdad